The 2014 Paris–Roubaix was the 112th edition of the Paris–Roubaix race, that took place on 13 April 2014, over a distance of  and was the tenth race of the 2014 UCI World Tour. The race was won by Niki Terpstra of the  team, after he attacked from a small group of riders with around  remaining.

Cobbled sectors

Teams
As Paris–Roubaix was a UCI World Tour event, all 18 UCI ProTeams were invited automatically and obligated to send a squad. Seven other squads were given wildcard places, thus completing the 25-team peloton.

The 25 teams that competed in the race were:

Results

References

External links

Paris–Roubaix
Paris-Roubaix
Paris-Roubaix
Paris-Roubaix